The Sowers of the Thunder is a collection of historical short stories by Robert E. Howard.  It was first published in 1973 by Donald M. Grant, Publisher, Inc. in an edition of 2,509 copies.  Grant reprinted the book in 1976 in an edition of 1,250 copies.

Contents
 Introduction, by Roy G. Krenkel
 The Lion of Tiberias"
 "The Sowers of the Thunder"
 "Lord of Samarcand"
 "The Shadow of the Vulture"

References

1973 short story collections
Short story collections by Robert E. Howard
Donald M. Grant, Publisher books